Panama is a coastal village in the Eastern Province of Sri Lanka, located  south of Batticaloa and  south of Arugam Bay. It is the last populated settlement in the southernmost part of the province, within the Ampara District. Kumana Bird Sanctuary and Heritage park starts southwards from Panama.

Panama was the capital of the Colonial Panamapattuwa of Mattakkalappu Desam. This ancient village can be seen in the historical maps of Portuguese and Dutch as Panao, Panova, and Paneme. Panama's inhabitants are mixed people of Sinhalese and Tamils. Panama is known for its Pattini Cult.

The village's name has been a cause for mix-up by Sri Lanka Post resulting in local mail being wrongly redirected to the Central American nation of Panama and vice versa for international mail.

See also

Okanda

Villages in Ampara District
Lahugala DS Division